Badminton at the 2010 Asian Games was held in Tianhe Gymnasium, Guangzhou, China from 13 November to 21 November 2010.

Singles, doubles, and team events were contested for both men and women. Mixed Doubles were also contested.

Schedule

Medalists

Medal table

Participating nations
A total of 190 athletes from 17 nations competed in badminton at the 2010 Asian Games:

References
Full Results

External links
Official website (badminton)

 
2010
Asian Games
2010 Asian Games events
2010 Asian Games